The 40th Independent Krasnodarsko-Kharbinsky Twice Red Banner Naval Infantry Brigade is a brigade of the Russian Naval Infantry. It is based in Petropavlovsk-Kamchatskiy in the Russian Far East and has the Military Unit Number (v/ch) 10103. It is part of the North-East Group of Troops and Forces, a joint command directed by the headquarters of the Navy's Kamchatka Flotilla.

History
The brigade has a rather unusual history, in that it can trace its origins to a Red Army division formed in 1918, which became best known as the 22nd Rifle Division (not to be confused with the 22nd Guards Rifle Division).

Historical names
2nd Infantry DivisionNikolayevsky Infantry Division30th Nikolayevsky Soviet Infantry Division3rd Independent Naval Infantry Regiment40th Independent Naval Infantry Brigade40th Independent Motor Rifle Brigade22nd Motor Rifle Division22nd Rifle Division

Early history
The division was first formed on 22 September 1918, as the 2nd Infantry Division. It was based on guerrilla groups from Nikolayevsk  (in the Volga region), Novouzensk (in Samara Governorate) and Malousensk Volost  (Samara Governorate), and two volunteer workers' units, from Balashov and Penza (both in the Volga region).

From 2 October 1918 it was known as the Nikolayevsky Infantry Division, from 24 November 1918 as the 30th Nikolayevsky Soviet Infantry Division and from 13 January 1919 as the Nikolayevsky Infantry Division. After the previous redesignations, on 25 March 1919, it was named the 22nd Rifle Division.

After the end of the Russian Civil War, the division was stationed in Krasnodar. A few years later, the 74th Taman Territorial Rifle Division (1921–1942) separated from the division.

For military services on February 21, 1931, the division was awarded the Honor of the Red Banner.

In 1937, the division was relocated to the Far East, where a military conflict with the Japanese was brewing. In the summer of 1938, the 195th Yeisk rifle regiment of the division took part in the Battle of Lake Khasan.

Second World War
At the start of Operation Barbarossa in June 1941, the 22nd Rifle Division was stationed in the Far East. It did not take part in the battles with Germany, but between 1941 and 1943, the division sent 6086 soldiers to the Western Front.
In May 1945, the 22nd Rifle Division became part of the 1st Red Banner Army, an independent coastal formation, in the Russian Far East. It saw active service during the Soviet invasion of Manchuria.

Cold War

In late 1945, the 22nd Rifle Division became part of the 137th Rifle Corps at Kamchatka. It was re-designated from 22nd Rifle Division to 22nd Motor Rifle Division in 1957, part of the 43rd Army Corps. In 1980 it became part of the new 25th Army Corps. In 1982, its 168th Tank Regiment became the 59th Independent Tank Battalion.

During the late 1980s, the division included the following units:

Division Headquarters (Chapayevka)
59th Separate Tank Battalion
211th Motor Rifle Regiment (Dolinovka)
246th Motor Rifle Regiment  (Rodygino)
304th Motor Rifle Regiment
996th Artillery Regiment
1006th Anti-Aircraft Rocket Regiment
309th Separate Rocket Battalion
795th Separate Anti-Tank Battalion
784th Separate Reconnaissance Battalion
765th Separate Engineer-Sapper Battalion
124th Separate Communications Battalion
591st Separate Chemical Defense Battalion
197th Separate Equipment Maintenance and Recovery Battalion
24th Separate Medical Battalion
1251st Separate Material Support Battalion
Military Counterintelligence Department

After the dissolution of the Soviet Union

Until 1 June 2002, it was designated the 22nd Motor Rifle Division. It then became the 40th independent Motorised Rifle Brigade. In September 2007 it became the 40th Independent (twice Red Banner) Krasnodar-Harbin twice Red Banner Naval Infantry Brigade. This situation lasted until March, 2009 when it became the 3rd Naval Infantry Regiment. In 2013, the regiment was redesignated back to become the 40th Naval Infantry Brigade.

It is reported that its current (when?) commander is Colonel Valery Zhila.

Today it is reported to include:
Assault (Airborne) Battalion
Naval Infantry Battalion
Artillery Battery
186th NI Engineer Battalion

The brigade also incorporates a tank battalion which reportedly re-equipped with the T-80BV main battle tank in 2021.

It was reported on 19 March 2022 that the brigade was transferred to Belarus to replenish Russian losses after the 2022 Russian invasion of Ukraine. By May 19, 2022, it was in active combat in Ukraine.

References

 
Carey Schofield, 'Inside the Soviet Army', Headline Book Publishing, 1991, 114, 120–121.

External links
http://warfare.be/?lang=&catid=321&linkid=2234

Naval infantry brigades of Russia
Military units and formations established in 2002